MazaCoin (Maza, MZC) is a cryptocurrency launched in 2014.

History
Some Native Americans adopted the use of MazaCoin to battle the US Government.

In October 2017, a Mashable article on the Oglala Lakota included a video about Harris's efforts to get MazaCoin accepted.

References

Further reading 
 Indigenous cryptocurrency: Affective capitalism and rhetorics of sovereignty in First Monday (3 October 2016, Volume 21, Number 10) by Cindy Tekobbe and John Carter McKnight
 Decolonization in a Digital Age: Cryptocurrencies and Indigenous Self-Determination in Canada in Canadian Journal of Law and Society (1 April 2017, Volume 32, Issue 1, pp. 19-35) by Christopher Alcantara and Caroline Dick

External links 
 

Cryptocurrency projects
Currencies introduced in 2014